Black Market Records is an American record label based in Sacramento, California founded in 1989. Its acts included Brotha Lynch Hung and X-Raided.

History
Black Market Records was founded in 1980 by Cedric Singleton. In 1992 the label released Sacramento rapper X-Raided's album "Psycho Active" featuring Brotha Lynch Hung. In 1993 the label released Brotha Lynch Hung's EP 24 Deep, which rose to no. 91 on Billboard's Top R&B/Hip-Hop Albums chart, the label's first album to chart. Brotha Lynch Hung later released "Season of da Siccness", the label's second album to chart. X-Raided left Black Market after his contract ended in 2000.

Acts
Current
Friction
Gatorman
Hanabal
Insanity
Jacavelli 190
Brotha Lynch Hung
Luchiano Brigante
Nicca Sicc
Pharoah Davinci
Young Dooby
Yung Roe
Sha Hef
Former
187
The 916 Alliance
Bandana tha Ragg
B.P.M.
Big Lurch
Black Dynasty
Black Rhino
C-Bo
Cold World Hustlers
D-Flex
Daz Dillinger
DC Ray
Doomsday
Endangered Species
Fed-X
Foe
G-Macc
Gangsta Dre
Ganksta NIP
Habeas Corpus
Keak da Sneak
Kock D ZEL
Mr. Doctor
Mozzy
Nonfiktion
P.C.O
Pizo
Sicx
Triple beam
TRU
W.B.K. Mobb
X-Raided

References

American record labels